Osteoporosis International is a peer-reviewed medical journal published by Springer Science+Business Media. The journal was launched in 1990. It is an official journal of the International Osteoporosis Foundation and the National Osteoporosis Foundation. The journal is published monthly and includes original research on all areas of osteoporosis and its related fields, alongside reviews, educational articles, and case reports.  
 
The co-editors-in-chief are J.A. Kanis and F. Cosman. According to the Journal Citation Reports, the journal has a 2016 impact factor of 3.591, ranking it 52nd out of 138 journals in the category "Endocrinology and Metabolism".

References

External links

National Osteoporosis Foundation
 
Publications established in 1990
English-language journals
Monthly journals
Springer Science+Business Media academic journals
Endocrinology journals